Marcus Reginald Anthony Samuel (7 September 1873 – 3 March 1942) was a British Conservative Party politician.

At the 1929 general election he stood unsuccessfully in Southwark North, losing his deposit.
He was elected as the Member of Parliament (MP) for Putney at a by-election in November 1934 after the death of his relative, Conservative MP Samuel Samuel.
He was re-elected in general election in November 1935

and held the seat until his death in March 1942, aged 68.

References

External links 
 

1873 births
1942 deaths
Conservative Party (UK) MPs for English constituencies
UK MPs 1931–1935
UK MPs 1935–1945
Jewish British politicians
English people of Iraqi-Jewish descent